Newburg is an unincorporated community and census-designated place (CDP) in Blair County, Pennsylvania, United States. It was first listed as a CDP prior to the 2020 census.

The CDP is in western Blair County, in Logan Township along the western border of Altoona. Pennsylvania Route 36 (18th Street) runs through the community, leading southeast into Altoona and northwest up the Allegheny Front,  to Ashville.

Demographics

References 

Census-designated places in Blair County, Pennsylvania
Census-designated places in Pennsylvania